Durangonella is a genus of small freshwater snails with a gill and an operculum,  aquatic gastropod mollusks in the family Hydrobiidae.

Species
Species within the genus Durangonella include:
 Durangonella coahuilae Taylor, 1966 (durangonella de coahuila snail)

References

 
Hydrobiidae
Taxonomy articles created by Polbot